Pest is the eastern, mostly flat part of Budapest, Hungary, comprising about two-thirds of the city's territory. It is separated from Buda and Óbuda, the western parts of Budapest, by the Danube River. Among its most notable sights are the Inner City, the Hungarian Parliament Building, Heroes' Square and Andrássy Avenue. 

In colloquial Hungarian, "Pest" is often used for the whole capital of Budapest. The three parts of Budapest (Pest, Buda, Óbuda) united in 1873.

Etymology
According to Ptolemy the settlement was called Pession in ancient times (Contra-Aquincum). Alternatively, the name Pest may have come from a Slavic word meaning "furnace", "oven" (Bulgarian  ; Serbian /peć; Croatian peć), related to the word  (meaning "cave"), probably with reference to a local cave where fire burned. The spelling Pesth was occasionally used in English, even as late as the early 20th century, although it is now considered archaic.

History

Pest was originally founded as a Celtic settlement, then a fortified camp established by the Romans (Contra-Aquincum) across the river from their military border camp at Aquincum. Remains of the original Roman camp can still be seen at Március 15. tér.

During the Middle Ages, Pest was an independent city separate from Buda/Ofen, which became an important economic center during the 11th–13th centuries. The first written mention dates back to 1148.

Pest was destroyed in 1241 Mongol invasion of Hungary, but was rebuilt shortly thereafter.

Demographically, in the 15th century Pest was mostly Hungarian, while Buda across the Danube had a German-majority population.

In 1838 Pest was flooded by the Danube; parts of the city were under as much as eight feet of water, and the flood destroyed or seriously damaged three-fourths of the city’s buildings. In 1849 the first suspension bridge, the Széchenyi Chain Bridge, was constructed across the Danube connecting Pest with Buda. Subsequently, in 1873, the two cities were unified with Óbuda to become Budapest.

Notable people

László Teleki (1811–1861), writer, statesman and magician
Henrik Weber (1818–1866), painter
Theodor Herzl (1860–1904), founder of the political Zionist movement
Harry Houdini (1874–1926), illusionist, escape acts performer

See also
 Budapest
 Inner City (Budapest)
 Pest County
 Újpest (New Pest)
 Kispest (Little Pest)
 Pestszentlőrinc (Saint Lawrence of Pest)
 Buda
 Óbuda (Old Buda)

References

Further reading
 Beksics, Gusztáv: Magyarosodás és magyarositás. Különös tekintettel városainkra. Budapest, 1883

External links

 
Geography of Budapest